Lucius Aelius Helvius Dionysius was a Roman statesman who served as the Proconsul of Africa from 296 to 300 and as the Praefectus urbi from 301 to 302.

References

Further reading
 L. Aelius Helvius Dionysius 12, The Prosopography of the Later Roman Empire, volume 1, Cambridge University Press, 1992, p. 260.

3rd-century Romans
4th-century Romans
Roman governors of Africa
Urban prefects of Rome
Year of birth unknown
Year of death unknown
Helvius Dionysius, Lucius
Aelius Dionysius, Lucius